Jeremiah Hall  is an American football fullback who is a free agent. He played college football for the Oklahoma Sooners.

Early life and high school
Hall grew up in Charlotte, North Carolina and attended Zebulon B. Vance High School. He was named first-team All-State as a senior after gaining 1,005 yards of total offense and scoring 22 touchdowns. Hall was rated a three-star recruit and committed to play college football at Oklahoma over offers from Maryland, Pittsburgh, and Syracuse.

College career
Hall redshirted his true freshman season at Oklahoma. He played in all 14 of Oklahoma's games during his redshirt freshman season and rushed four times for 21 yards and had two receptions for 36 yards. As a redshirt sophomore, Hall caught 16 passes for 169 yards and 3 touchdowns and was named second-team All-Big 12 Conference. He was named first-team All-Big 12 after catching 18 passes for 218 yards and five touchdowns. He repeated as a first-team All-Big 12 selection after finishing his senior season with 32 receptions for 334 yards and four touchdowns.

Professional career
Hall signed with the New York Giants as an undrafted free agent on May 16, 2022. He was waived on August 16, 2022.

References

External links
Oklahoma Sooners bio
New York Giants bio

Living people
American football fullbacks
New York Giants players
Oklahoma Sooners football players
Players of American football from Charlotte, North Carolina
1998 births